A ministry of trade and industry, ministry of commerce, ministry of commerce and industry or variations is a ministry that is concerned with a nation's trade, industry and commerce.

Notable examples are:

List
Algeria: Ministry of Industry and Mines
Australia:
 Minister for Trade and Investment (Australia)
 Minister for Trade, Tourism and Major Events (New South Wales)
Azerbaijan:
 Ministry of Industry and Energy (Azerbaijan)
 Ministry of Defence Industry of Azerbaijan
Ministry of Economic Development (Azerbaijan)
Brazil: Ministry of Development, Industry and Foreign Trade (Brazil)
Brunei:
 Ministry of Energy, Manpower and Industry
 Ministry of Finance and Economy (Brunei)
 Ministry of Primary Resources and Tourism
Cambodia: Ministry of Industry, Mining and Energy (Cambodia)
Canada: 
 Innovation, Science and Economic Development Canada
 Minister of International Trade (Canada)
Manitoba
 Minister of Industry and Commerce (Manitoba)
 Ministry of Industry, Trade and Tourism (Manitoba); defunct
 Ministry of Industry, Trade and Technology (Manitoba); defunct
 Ministry of Industry, Economic Development and Mines (Manitoba); defunct
Ontario: 
 Ministry of Industry, Trade and Technology (Ontario; defunct)
China: 
 Ministry of Commerce of the People's Republic of China
 Ministry of Industry and Information Technology of the People's Republic of China
 Ministry of Aerospace Industry (People's Republic of China; defunct)
Colombia: 
Ministry of Commerce, Industry and Tourism (Colombia)
Ministry of Foreign Trade (Colombia)
Czech Republic:  Ministry of Industry and Trade (Czech Republic)
Denmark: Ministry of Trade and Industry (Denmark)
Egypt: 
Ministry of Industry, Trade and Small Industries
Ministry of Trade and Industry (Egypt)
Finland: Ministry of Economic Affairs and Employment (Finland)
France: 
 Minister of Commerce (France)
 Ministry of Economy, Finance and Industry (France)
Ghana: 
Ministry of Trade and Industry (Ghana)
 Minister for Trade and Industry (Ghana)
Minister for Trade and Industry (Ghana)
Greece: Minister for Trade (Greece)
 Hong Kong: Trade and Industry Department
Iceland:
 Ministry of Industry, Energy and Tourism (Iceland)
 Ministry of Trade (Iceland)
 Minister of Industry and Commerce (Iceland)
India: 
 Ministry of Commerce and Industry (India)
 Ministry of Heavy Industries and Public Enterprises (India)
 Ministry of Food Processing Industries (India)
 Ministry of Agro and Rural Industries (India)
 Ministry of Small Scale Industries (India; defunct)
Indonesia: 
Ministry of Trade (Indonesia)
Ministry of Industry (Indonesia)
Iran:
 Ministry of Commerce (Iran)
 Ministry of Industries and Mines (Iran)
Iraq:
 Ministry of Industry (Iraq)
 Ministry of Trade (Iraq)
Ireland: Minister for Enterprise, Trade and Employment
Israel: Ministry of Economy (Israel) 
Japan: 
 Ministry of International Trade and Industry (Japan; defunct)
 Ministry of Economy, Trade and Industry (Japan)
Minister of Economy, Trade and Industry
 Ministry of Commerce and Industry
Kuwait: Ministry of Commerce (Kuwait)
Laos: Ministry of Industry and Commerce (Laos)
Malaysia: Ministry of International Trade and Industry (Malaysia)
Moldova: Ministry of Agriculture and Food Industry (Moldova)
Myanmar: Ministry of Industry (Myanmar)
Nepal: Ministry of Industry (Nepal)
Nigeria: Nigerian Federal Ministry of Commerce
North Korea:
Ministry of Commerce
Ministry of External Economic Relations
Norway:
 Ministry of Trade and Industry (Norway)
 Minister of Trade and Shipping (Norway)
Philippines: Department of Trade and Industry (Philippines)
Pakistan: 
 Ministry of Commerce (Pakistan)
 Ministry of Industry (Pakistan)
Russia:
 Ministry of Industry (Russia)
 Ministry of Industry and Trade (Russia)
Rwanda: Ministry of Trade and Industry (Rwanda)
Saudi Arabia: Ministry of Commerce and Investment (Saudi Arabia)
Serbia: Minister of Trade, Telecommunications and Tourism (Serbia)
Sierra Leone: Ministry of Trade and Industry (Sierra Leone)
Singapore:
 Ministry of Trade and Industry (Singapore)
 Minister for Trade and Industry (Singapore)
South Africa: 
 Department of Trade and Industry (South Africa)
 Ministry of Trade and Industry (South Africa)
South Korea: Ministry of Commerce, Industry and Energy (South Korea)
Soviet Union:
 Ministry of Construction of Heavy Industry (USSR; defunct)
 Ministry of Foreign Trade (Soviet Union)
 Ministry of Transport Machine-Building Industry (USSR; defunct)
 Ministry of Shipbuilding Industry (USSR; defunct)
 Ministry of Aviation Industry (Soviet Union); defunct
Spain: Ministry of Industry (Spain)
Sri Lanka: Ministry of Industry and Commerce (Sri Lanka)
Sweden: 
Ministry of Industry (Sweden)
Ministry of Commerce and Industry (Sweden)
Syria: Ministry of Industry (Syria)
Tanzania: Ministry of Industry, Trade and Marketing, of Tanzania
Thailand: Ministry of Industry (Thailand)
Trinidad and Tobago: Ministry of Trade and Industry (Trinidad and Tobago)
Turkey: Ministry of Industry and Commerce (Turkey)
Uganda: Ministry of Trade, Tourism and Industry (Uganda)
United Kingdom:
Department for International Trade
Ministry of Trade and Industry (Isle of Man)
United States: United States Department of Commerce
Vietnam: 
 Ministry of Industry and Trade (Vietnam)
 Ministry of Industry (Vietnam) (defunct)
 Ministry of Trade (Vietnam) (defunct)
Zimbabwe: Ministry of Industry and Commerce (Zimbabwe)

See also
Minister of Commerce
Minister of Trade
Minister of Industry
Department of Commerce (disambiguation)

References

Former disambiguation pages converted to set index articles

Trade and Industry
 
[[Category:dti Ministry of Trade and Industry, Ministry of Commerce, Ministry of Commerce and Industry